Kristopher Kyle Wilson (born August 6, 1976) is a former professional baseball pitcher. He played parts of five seasons in Major League Baseball, one season in Korea, and two seasons in Italy.

Amateur career
Wilson attended Georgia Tech, and in 1995 and 1996 he played collegiate summer baseball with the Falmouth Commodores of the Cape Cod Baseball League where he was named a league all-star in 1995.

Professional career
Wilson was drafted in the ninth round of the 1997 Major League Baseball Draft by the Kansas City Royals, for whom he pitched from 2000 to 2003. In Kansas City, he split time between the bullpen and starting rotation with 19 starts.

Wilson was signed by the New York Yankees as a fre agent during the 2005 season on May 17, and was assigned to the Triple-A Columbus Clippers. He was called up from Columbus on July 5, 2006, and made a relief appearance against the Cleveland Indians, pitching two scoreless innings and giving up no hits. He made his only start for the Yankees on July 9 against the Tampa Bay Devil Rays replacing Shawn Chacón, lasting just 2 innings while giving up 3 runs on 5 hits. He was replaced in the starting rotation by newly acquired Sidney Ponson, and sent down to the bullpen. Wilson was designated for assignment on July 24.

Wilson signed with the Samsung Lions of the KBO, but was released by the Lions during the 2007 season. On December 8, 2007, Wilson signed with the Philadelphia Phillies, but did not pitch a game for the Phillies.

References

External links

Career statistics and player information from Korea Baseball Organization

Major League Baseball pitchers
Kansas City Royals players
New York Yankees players
Samsung Lions players
Spokane Indians players
Lansing Lugnuts players
Wilmington Blue Rocks players
Wichita Wranglers players
Omaha Golden Spikes players
Omaha Royals players
Columbus Clippers players
Trenton Thunder players
Georgia Tech Yellow Jackets baseball players
Falmouth Commodores players
KBO League pitchers
American expatriate baseball players in South Korea
Baseball players from Washington, D.C.
1976 births
Living people
American expatriate baseball players in Italy
Nettuno Baseball Club players